Raucaffrinoline is an indole alkaloid isolated from the leaves of Rauvolfia yunnanensis.

References

Indole alkaloids
Alkaloids found in Rauvolfia
Heterocyclic compounds with 6 rings
Acetate esters